Marvin Lawrence "Swede" Ellstrom (May 15, 1906 – April 25, 1994) was an American football running back in the National Football League for the Boston Redskins, Philadelphia Eagles, Pittsburgh Pirates, and Chicago Cardinals.  He played college football at the University of Oklahoma.

References

1906 births
1994 deaths
American football running backs
Boston Redskins players
Boston Shamrocks (AFL) players
Chicago Cardinals players
Oklahoma Sooners football players
People from Moline, Illinois
Philadelphia Eagles players